Curaçao Football Federation is the football association of Curaçao. It is the legal successor of the Netherlands Antillean Football Union, which ended with the dissolution of the Netherlands Antilles in 2010. International matches are represented by the Curaçao national football team. The NAVU was renamed to FFK on 9 February 2011 after FIFA had encouraged changing the name and update statutes, like dealing with Bonaire, who belonged then to the Netherlands.

Association staff

References

External links
  
 Curaçao at FIFA 
 Curaçao at CONCACAF 

Football in Curaçao
CONCACAF member associations
Football
Sports organizations established in 1921
1921 establishments in Curaçao and Dependencies